Rome: Caesar's Will is an educational adventure game released in 2000.

Production 
A substantial part of the game's promotion was focused on an "innovative dialogue and artificial intelligence engine" called ReActiveAttitudes technology, which meant that the player could have a personality or "mask" when speaking to a character. If the player approaches the character in a "friendly" or "insulting" way, this would affect how the character interacted, resulting in branching narratives of allies and enemies.

Plot 
The game revolves around a murder mystery set in 44BC. As a Roman legioner, the player takes on the role of detective who has to prove Aurelia didn't poison her husband, and solve the crime before time runs out.

Gameplay 
The game has a time limit of 40 hours; actions such as moving locations via the map cause the player to lose precious seconds. The interface contains an inventory of items, a notepad to write down clues, and an encyclopedia to give the player additional background knowledge as they play.

Critical reception 
Jeux Video praised the music and sound effects for creating a sense of atmospheric suspense. Tom Houston of Just Adventure criticised the ReActiveAttitudes technology for not delivering a diverging series of stories as promised.

References 

2000 video games
Video games set in the 1st century BC
Adventure games
Detective video games
Educational video games
Video games developed in France
Windows games
Windows-only games
Depictions of Julius Caesar in video games